Seehamer See is a lake in the Alpine foothills, Bavaria, Germany. At an elevation of 653 m, its surface area is 1.47 km².

See also 
List of lakes in Bavaria

Lakes of Bavaria
LSeehamer